Bossangoa is the capital of Ouham, one of the 14 prefectures of the Central African Republic. The town has a population of 36,478 (2003 census). It is located 303 km (189 mi) north of the country's capital, Bangui. The Ouham River passes through Bossangoa and on through a number of waterfalls east of the city before turning north to join the Chari River in Chad.

The Mandjia, the third most populous ethnic group in the Central African Republic, are concentrated in Bossangoa. Along with the Baya, a closely related group, the Mandjia are important historically for their resistance to invasion by various Muslim powers to the north. From 1901 to 1905 Bossangoa and the surrounding area was in rebellion against French colonial authorities. Bossangoa became a center of Protestant missionary activity during the 1920s. In 1959, the city was made the seat of the Apostolic Prefecture of Bossangoa from the Diocese of Berbérati.  In 1964, it was promoted as the Diocese of Bossangoa.  In June 1980 the city was the scene of clashes between police and farmers over government food policies. The next year French troops were called in to suppress rioting in the aftermath of elections.

There is a small local airport that serves light planes. The main agricultural products are cotton and coffee.

Climate
Bossangoa has a tropical savanna climate (Köppen climate classification Aw).

2012-2014 Conflict
In March 2013, rebels of the Séléka Alliance overtook the town, as part of the 2012-13 Central African Republic conflict. The rebels are seeking to overthrow the government of President of the Central African Republic François Bozizé

In January 2014, Bossangoa was described as a ghost town, "strangely empty" with "no people, only charred houses and storefronts, block after block of blackened roofless dwellings, an abandoned bank, a gas station stripped down to the metal frames of its pumps, and an emptied city hall." The population, which once numbered 50,000, has mostly fled the city to escape communal violence between Muslims and Christians in the aftermath of the civil war. The population was living in two separate camps – one for Muslims and one for Christians.

In April 2014, Chadian troops escorting a convoy of "the last 540 Muslim residents of the northwestern town of Bossangoa to Goré, Chad," were attacked by local militia as they passed through Boguila." Three people were wounded. On 24 February 2021 government forces captured Bossangoa.

See also
 List of cities in the Central African Republic

References

Sub-prefectures of the Central African Republic
Populated places in Ouham